Victoria is an underground station of the Kolkata Metro in Kolkata, West Bengal. It is a station (planned & proposed) of the Kolkata Metro Line 3 at Hastings. Victoria station is located between Park Street and Kidderpore metro station. This station will be built in the second phase of the construction of the Kolkata Metro Line 3. There will be two platforms at this station.

References

Kolkata Metro stations

Railway stations in Kolkata